Perry Township is one of the twenty-five townships of Muskingum County, Ohio, United States.  The 2000 census found 2,420 people in the township.

Geography
Located in the east central part of the county, it borders the following townships:
Salem Township - north
Highland Township - northeast corner
Union Township - east
Salt Creek Township - south
Wayne Township - southwest
Washington Township - west

No municipalities are located in Perry Township.

Name and history
Perry Township was established in 1812, and named after Oliver Hazard Perry (1785–1819), an American naval officer. It is one of twenty-six Perry Townships statewide.

By the 1830s, Perry Township contained three churches, four flouring mills, and five saw mills.

Government
The township is governed by a three-member board of trustees, who are elected in November of odd-numbered years to a four-year term beginning on the following January 1. Two are elected in the year after the presidential election and one is elected in the year before it. There is also an elected township fiscal officer, who serves a four-year term beginning on April 1 of the year after the election, which is held in November of the year before the presidential election. Vacancies in the fiscal officership or on the board of trustees are filled by the remaining trustees.

References

External links
County website

Townships in Muskingum County, Ohio
Townships in Ohio